Wałpusz  is a village in the administrative district of Gmina Szczytno, within Szczytno County, Warmian-Masurian Voivodeship, in northern Poland.

About 1785 there have been 12 households.

Until 1945 the area was part of Germany (East Prussia).

References

Villages in Szczytno County